Raphael Bendicht Urweider was born on 5 November 1974 in Bern, Switzerland. He is a writer in English and German and  a musician.

Career 
Raphael Urweider is the son of a reformed minister. He studied German literature and philosophy at the University of Fribourg. He performed with LDeeP and has composed music for a number of plays. He also worked on two plays with Samuel Schwarz – Maxim Gorki Theatre and Deutsches Schauspielhaus (Hamburg). His first volume of poetry, Light in Menlo Park, was published in 2000. He subsequently published "Kobold and the Kunstpfeifer" in 2002, "The opposite of meat" in 2003, and "Poems of craze and longing" in 2008. He has also translated plays and poetry.

Awards 
In 1999, he received the Arbeitsstipendium des Deutschen Literaturfonds and the Leonce-und-Lena-Preis. In 2001, he was awarded the Förderpreis des Bremer Literaturpreises, the 3sat award at the Ingeborg Bachmann Competition in 2002, and the Clemens-Brentano-Preis in 2004. In 2009, he received the 'Schillerpreis' for his poetry in 'Alle deine Namen'.

References

External links

 

People from Bern
Swiss writers
Living people
1974 births